

Group A

Estonia
Estonia's 20-man squad to play in the 2014 Commonwealth of Independent States Cup.

Coach: Martin Reim

Tajikistan
Tajikistan 20 man squad to play in the 2014 Commonwealth of Independent States Cup.

Coach: Makhmadjon Khabibulloev

Ukraine
Ukraine 23 man squad to play in the 2014 Commonwealth of Independent States Cup.

Coach: Serhiy Kovalets

Kyrgyzstan
Kyrgyzstan 22 man squad to play in the 2014 Commonwealth of Independent States Cup.

Coach: Anarbek Ormonbekov

Group B

Lithuania

Saint Petersburg

Russia
Russia 23 man squad to play in the 2014 Commonwealth of Independent States Cup.

Coach: Nikolai Pisarev

Moldova
Moldova 23 man squad to play in the 2014 Commonwealth of Independent States Cup.

Coach: Alexandru Curtianu

Group C

Latvia

Moscow
Moscow 23 man squad to play in the 2014 Commonwealth of Independent States Cup.

Coach: Vladimir Scherbak

Belarus
Belarus 20 man squad to play in the 2014 Commonwealth of Independent States Cup.

Coach: Igor Kovalevich

Kazakhstan
Kazakhstan 25 man squad to play in the 2014 Commonwealth of Independent States Cup.

Coach: Saulius Širmelis

References

Commonwealth of Independent States Cup